Signal Production Association is a company based in Chelyabinsk, Russia. It is part of NPO Pribor, a Techmash company (Rostec group).

The Signal Production Association is a manufacturer of pyrotechnics and explosives that once produced for the military but is reported to have completely suspended defense production. It is now producing fireworks, batteries, household chemicals, items for restaurants and fire-fighting equipment.

References

Manufacturing companies of Russia
Companies based in Chelyabinsk
Tecmash
Defence companies of the Soviet Union